Harlem Street Singer is a studio album by the American gospel blues singer-guitarist Blind Gary Davis, recorded in 1960 and released on the Bluesville label in December of that year. It features perhaps his best-known song "Death Don't Have No Mercy".

Critical reception

Harlem Street Singer was met with critical acclaim. According to the journalist and Davis biographer Ian Zack, it proved to be "Davis's masterpiece and one of the most breathtaking recordings of the folk era", with "Rudy Van Gelder's pristine engineering capturing Davis's stellar guitar work and impassioned singing like lightning in a box". AllMusic reviewer Matt Fink later said, "Davis laid down 12 of his most impassioned spirituals for Harlem Street Singer ... Overall, the collection is well worth the purchase and should be considered essential listening for fans of country blues or gospel".

Track listing
All compositions by Gary Davis except where noted
 "Samson and Delilah" (Traditional) – 4:02
 "Let Us Get Together" – 3:08
 "I Belong to the Band" – 2:54
 "Pure Religion" (Traditional) – 2:57
 "Great Change Since I Been Born" – 4:03
 "Death Don't Have No Mercy" – 4:41
 "Twelve Gates to the City" (Traditional) – 3:08
 "Goin' to Sit Down on the Banks of the River" – 2:55
 "Tryin' to Get Home" – 3:46
 "Lo I Be With You Always" – 4:17
 "I Am the Light of the World" – 3:34
 "I Feel Just Like Goin' On" – 3:29

Personnel

Performance
Blind Gary Davis – guitar, vocals

Production
 Kenneth S. Goldstein – supervision
 Rudy Van Gelder – engineer

References

External links
 

Reverend Gary Davis albums
1960 albums
Bluesville Records albums
Albums recorded at Van Gelder Studio